The discography of Children of Bodom, a five-piece melodic death metal band from Espoo, Finland. Throughout their career, the band has been known to incorporate many different musical styles, leading critics and fans to label them as everything from melodic death metal and black metal to thrash metal, progressive metal and even power metal.
The band's final line-up before they officially disbanded in 2019 included the founders Alexi Laiho (lead vocals, lead guitar) and Jaska Raatikainen (drums) along with Henkka Seppälä (bass guitar), Janne Wirman (keyboards) and Daniel Freyberg (rhythm guitar). Children of Bodom have released ten studio albums, two live albums, one compilation album, seven singles, two EPs and two split singles. Moreover, in the period 1994–1996 they released three demos under their old moniker, IneartheD. This list includes the material released as IneartheD.

Children of Bodom's first release under their new name was the split single "Children of Bodom", released in January 1997. Their debut album Something Wild followed later the same year. 1999 saw the release of two Children of Bodom albums: their second studio album, Hatebreeder, and their first live album, titled Tokyo Warhearts.
In 2001 they released their third studio album, Follow the Reaper, which included the successful single "Hate Me!". Follow the Reaper was the first Children of Bodom album to go gold in their home country of Finland.

After renewing their contract with Spinefarm Records, thereby gaining the support of the major recording company Universal Music Group, the band recorded their fourth studio album Hate Crew Deathroll, which was released in 2003 to considerable commercial success. Hate Crew Deathroll was the first Children of Bodom album to 'simplify' their heavy metal in order to have a broader appeal: the guitars used more heavy riffs than their earlier releases, it had emphasis on a clear musical structure and the instrumental virtuosity had been significantly reduced.

Rhythm guitarist Alexander Kuoppala left the band during the tours following Hate Crew Deathroll, and was replaced with Roope Latvala of Stone fame. On their fifth studio album, released in 2005 as Are You Dead Yet?, the band continued to explore the traits exhibited on Hate Crew Deathroll. The album received mixed reviews, with some critics praising the new sound, while others criticised it for being too "simple". Blooddrunk, was released in April 2008. The album Relentless Reckless Forever was released in March 2011 while they were on The Ugly World Tour 2011.

Their album Halo of Blood was released in 2013. I Worship Chaos followed in 2015 and the final album Hexed was released in 2019.

As of 2009, Children of Bodom have sold over two million records worldwide, including over 200,000 in Finland and over 500,000 in the United States.

Albums

Studio albums

Live albums

Compilation albums

Cover albums

Video albums

Demos

EPs

Notes
a.  Extended version of single under the same title. Despite being released as a CD/DVD, Trashed, Lost & Strungout charted on the Finnish Singles Chart.
b.  Applies to DVD edition of EP.
c.  Released only in the United Kingdom and Finland. Despite being released as an EP, Hellhounds on My Trail charted on the Finnish Singles Chart.

Singles

Commercial and promo singles

DVD singles

Music videos

See also
List of best-selling music artists in Finland

References

External links
 Children of Bodom's official website

Discography
Heavy metal group discographies
Discographies of Finnish artists